Mampad is a growing town in Malappuram district, Kerala, India. located about 08 km east of Nilambur city. Nearby places include Edavanna, Areacode, Manjeri, Wandoor and Pandikkad. It is under the Wandoor Assembly Constituency. Kozhikode-Nilambur-Gudalur (CNG Road) SH pass through here. The Mampad town is now developing day to day. Most people are engaged in agriculture and business activities. Hindus, Christians and Muslims co-exist in harmony adding to the diversity in faith and religion. The land is famous for football. The land where Asif Zahir Mampad Rahman played. He contributed a lot to the Malappuram district.

Schools
GUPS Kattumunda East
 GMLPS Kattumunda East
 A M L P S PULLODE
 A M A U P S Mampad
 G L P S Mampad
 G L P S Meppadam
 G V H S S Mampad
 M E S Higher Secondary School. Mampad
 Mampad High School
 Pullipadam Lp School
 Rahmania Higher Secondary School Meppadam
 The Springs International School
 AKM LP SCHOOL PONGALOOR
 Peace Public School Pallikkunnu

Colleges
 Dr. Gafoor Memorial MES Mampad College, Mampad
 NET Distance Education, (Under the Nest Educational Trust)

Hospitals 
Life Hospital
Primary health center Mampad

maternity care hospital

River
Chaliyar

Banks
 service co-operative bank
 Kerala Gramin Bank
 south indian bank
 vanitha cooperative bank

ATM 
 HDFC Bank ATM
 Kerala Gramin Bank ATM
 south indian Bank ATM
 State Bank of India, SBI ATM

Places of interest
 odayikkal regulator cum bridge 
 Pullipadam hanging bridge 
 oli waterfalls

Nearby Places

Edavanna
Nilambur
Chaliyar
Vadapuram
Wandoor
Areacode
Manjeri
Kattumunda
Pulikalody

Transportation
Mampad village connects to other parts of India through Nilambur town.  State Highway No.28 starts from Nilambur and connects to Ooty, Mysore and Bangalore through Highways.12,29 and 181. National highway No.66 passes through Ramanattukara and the northern stretch connects to Goa and Mumbai.  The southern stretch connects to Cochin and Trivandrum.   State.  The nearest airport is at Kozhikode.  The nearest railway station is at Nilambur

Image gallery

File:MAMPAD panjayath

References

External links

Cities and towns in Malappuram district
Nilambur area